The  is a river in Tōhoku region of the northern portion of the island of Honshū in Japan.

The river rises from Mount Nakadake and Mount Shikakudake in the Ōu Mountains and Mount Hachimantai near the border of Akita Prefecture with Iwate and Aomori Prefectures, and flows to the west through northern Akita Prefecture into the Sea of Japan at Noshiro, Akita.

References

 

Rivers of Akita Prefecture
Rivers of Japan